KOKO (previously called The Music Machine and Camden Palace) is a concert venue and former theatre in Camden Town, London, England. 

The building was known as Camden Palace from 1982 until its 2004 purchase and extensive restoration, led by Oliver Bengough and Mint Entertainment. Following the restoration the venue was renamed as KOKO and is one of the premier live music venues in London.

On the evening of 6 January 2020, a large fire broke out in the building.

History

1900–1945: Theatre and cinema 

The Camden Theatre opened on Boxing Day 1900. With a capacity of 2,434 it was one of the largest theatres in London outside the West End. The theatre was designed by the prolific theatre architect W. G. R. Sprague. Ellen Terry opened the theatre, then the most celebrated actress in England, who had lived in nearby Stanhope Street as a child.

The St Pancras Gazette, a local newspaper, commented as follows in a review of the theatre's production of an opera called The Geisha in 1901:

On 6 December 1909 it reopened as a variety theatre and became the Camden Hippodrome Theatre. By 1911 films were being presented as part of the variety programme and in January 1913 it became a cinema known as the Camden Hippodrome Picture Theatre. In January 1928, the theatre was bought by the Gaumont British cinema circuit.

1945–1972: BBC studio 

Closed during World War II, it outlived many similar buildings, including Camden Town's other theatre, the Bedford Theatre, because the BBC took it over to be used a radio and recording studio in 1945. They continued to use the former theatre until the early 1970s. Among the first weekly series to be broadcast live from here was The Richard Tauber Programme, from 1945–47. Later recorded at the theatre were The Goon Show and the first Monty Python's Flying Circus album (2 May 1970).

After the BBC left in 1972, the building remained empty for a number of years. It was even the subject of demolition proposals until it was Grade II architecturally listed in late 1972.

1977–1982: The Music Machine 

However, in 1977 it re-opened as a live music venue named The Music Machine. The venue was the central location for the 1979 Disco Dance film The Music Machine. The venue was particularly popular with new wave and punk bands, hosting concerts by groups including The Boomtown Rats, The Clash, and The Jam . It was the last venue AC/DC's Bon Scott was seen drinking at before his death from alcohol poisoning in 1980. After leaving there, Scott finished up at The Dublin Castle on Camden's Parkway where he was placed in a taxi by a school teacher and later died that night.

1982–2004: Camden Palace 

In 1982 the venue was renamed Camden Palace. During this period, it hosted the weekly rock night "Feet First", each Tuesday. The nights were hosted by Jonathon and Eko of Feet First. Camden Palace was the location of Madonna's first UK performance.

After the early 1980s New Romantic scene, for which both the club and Steve Strange and Rusty Egan became world famous, the Camden Palace featured as a home for early 1980s dance and new wave club music imported from NYC, as well as pioneering early house music night "Delerium", which was run by Robin King in 1987 and featured resident DJs Colin Faver of Kiss FM and Eddie Richards. Famously Prince performed at the Camden Palace in 1988 on his Lovesexy Tour with Ronnie Wood of The Rolling Stones as guest guitarist, he later that evening held an invite only after party in the club and performed a couple of further impromptu numbers that night. Prince appeared and performed further full concerts at the club in later decades. Hüsker Dü played their first show outside of the US at the venue in 1985.

The early 1990s saw "Delerium" leave the Camden Palace club, and as rave music took hold Camden Palace became a mecca for the burgeoning rave music scene from 1989–92. The DJs during this period were DMC DJ John Saunderson and Chris Paul. Early PA performances included both The Prodigy and N-Joi. Appearances from live bands continued, however, including Blur and Cardiacs.

Later in the 1990s, the venue was famous for holding weekly rave events and was illuminated with UV lights, state of the art sound system and décor of the rave scene. During this time the legendary weekly house/acid house event, "Clockwork Orange" was held on a Saturday with Andy Manston and Danny Gould running until 2001, "Frantic" (hard house/trance) and the iconic house/trance event "Peach" with Graham Gold, Pele, Darren Pearce and Dave Lambert running until the Camden Palace closed in 2004.

2004–2020: Restoration and relaunch 

By 2004 the Camden Palace was rundown and in a state of disuse. That year the theatre was purchased by Oliver Bengough and his company Mint Entertainment. Bengough saw the potential of the theatre and embarked on a multimillion-pound restoration process lasting more than six months. The restoration process included all new technical facilities, enabling the scope of operations to be broadened to include live concert performances, club nights, corporate events and television production. The Daily Telegraph described the modern interior amenities and the building's historic facade as "lend[ing] a sense of grandeur to any gig".

In the 2010s, some events held at the Camden Palace returned to the venue, including reunions of "Peach" and "Clockwork Orange".

2020–present: Fire and reopening 

A large fire at the building during renovation work was reported at 8:56pm on 6 January 2020; eight fire engines and about 60 firefighters attended, and the blaze was declared under control at 2:37am. The cause of the fire is not known , but the damage appears to have been contained to the roof of the building.

Following a multimillion pound refurbishment, KOKO reopened in April 2022. The inaugural concert featured Arcade Fire, marking the release of their sixth studio album We.

Sustainability programme 

Since the 2004 restoration, KOKO's commitment to sustainability has been recognised with an award for Environmental Excellence in Camden Organisations (EECO), for Innovation in Waste Management and Recycling. The venue has been praised for "the continued exceptional effort by staff to achieve a 95% recycling rate in the difficult events and entertainment industry, and for the use of recycled materials within the building in order to close the recycling loop."

The key points in KOKO's innovative recycling and waste management strategy include:

 Recycling paper and cardboard (including flyers), as well as approximately 30,960 glass bottles, 20,088 aluminium cans and 77,166 plastic cups every month;
 Replacing 982 light bulbs with low energy light bulbs;
 Reducing emissions, by working with 'The Carbon Trust' and Better Climate for Camden: by switching to a green energy supplier, KOKO aims to prevent the release into the atmosphere of 520 tonnes of CO2 over the next 12 months;
 As KOKO currently produces approximately 310.809 tonnes of CO2 per annum, they have teamed up with Solar Aid who supply Solar Lanterns to under-developed countries to help offset this.

Notable events 

On 19 March 1964, The Rolling Stones performed at the venue. On 10 March 1970, The Faces performed there. On 30 April 1972, the theatre was the venue for The Goon Shows reunion episode The Last Goon Show of All, which was attended by several senior members of the royal family and which was filmed and recorded.

On 2 March 1978, The Jam performed, with the concert recorded and released as part of the 2015 box set Fire and Skill – The Jam Live, then subsequently given a limited standalone vinyl release.

On 10 September 1979, heavy metal band Iron Maiden performed a gig at The Music Machine. The band, at the time, consisted of Steve Harris (bass), Dave Murray (lead guitar), Paul Di'Anno (vocals), Tony Parsons (lead guitar) and Doug Sampson (drums).

On 14 November 1980, The Music Machine hosted an infamous gig by London mod revival band the Chords, where onstage interactions between the band members ranged from frosty to outright hostile and following the gig, the Chords' frontman Billy Hassett left the band acrimoniously and was later replaced by Kip Herring.

In 1985, Steve Marriott performed with his band Packet Of Three.

The cult London electronic band You You You, consisting of Karen O'Connor, Laurence Malice and Iain Williams, performed their debut concert at the Camden Palace on 13 January 1987. The band billed their first series of concerts as 'Stage 1' of their 'World Domination Tour' and enlisted the help of illustrator Mark Wardel to design their publicity. Their appearance at the Camden Palace attracted over 1,000 people on what the Met Office recorded as probably being England's coldest night of the 20th Century.

In 2005, a year after restoration, Coldplay chose KOKO to launch their album X&Y. Later that year, Madonna also hosted her album launch of Confessions on a Dance Floor at KOKO.

The next year, in 2006, Elton John hosted a benefit party at KOKO for his AIDS Charity Bash, attended by Natalie Imbruglia, Elle Macpherson, Jade Jagger, and Kevin Spacey.

Prince performed a secret show at KOKO in 2007, which was his first UK show in over 10 years. The American band My Chemical Romance also played a private show at KOKO in 2007, hosted by BBC Radio 1. Later in 2007, The Disney Channel used KOKO to host Hannah Montana's Live in London, an exclusive one-off event broadcast globally for her fans.

In 2008, Siouxsie Sioux recorded a live DVD at KOKO called Finale: The Last Mantaray & More Show which was released the following year.

In 2009, KOKO hosted the iTunes festival, which extended over 30 nights and featured guests including N.E.R.D, Paul Weller, James Blunt, Calvin Harris and Dizzee Rascal and over 45,000 people.

In 2010, KOKO also hosted fundraiser for the Institute of Contemporary Arts featuring a performance Lily Allen and Bryan Ferry and attended by Vivienne Westwood, Damien Hirst and Tracey Emin.

Since its restoration, the club has attracted well known musicians and DJs including The Damned, Terrorvision, Al Murray, Irfan Latif, Don Broco, Red Hot Chili Peppers, Madonna, Christina Aguilera, Coldplay, Tori Kelly, Katy B, My Chemical Romance, Emma Marrone, Oasis, Bruno Mars, Thom Yorke, Amy Winehouse, La Roux, Skrillex, Lady Gaga, The Killers, Kanye West, Katy Perry, Tokio Hotel, Lily Allen, Demi Lovato, Usher, Noel Gallagher, Swedish House Mafia, JoJo, Azealia Banks, Rolling Blackouts Coastal Fever, Masters at Work and many others.

In 2017, Ed Sheeran performed a private concert to promote his third studio album ÷ in partnership with UK radio station Capital FM, as also Ariana Grande in September 2018 to promote her fourth studio album, Sweetener.

References

Bibliography 

 Guide to British Theatres 1750–1950, John Earl and Michael Sell pp. 102 (Theatres Trust, 2000)

External links 

 Cinema Treasures history of Camden Hippodrome Picture Theatre
 History of the Camden Palace
 History of Camden Theatre with archive material

Nightclubs in London
Former theatres in London
Music venues in London
Grade II listed buildings in the London Borough of Camden
BBC offices, studios and buildings
Theatres completed in 1900
Tourist attractions in the London Borough of Camden
Camden Town
Wrestling venues